El Gran secreto is a 1942 Argentine film. A remake of the French Film “Conflict”, 1939

Cast

Mecha Ortiz - Alicia

External links
 

1942 films
1940s Spanish-language films
Argentine black-and-white films
1940s thriller films
Argentine thriller films
1940s Argentine films